Eidsgavlen Cliff is a cliff  south of the Eidshaugane Peaks in the Humboldt Mountains of Queen Maud Land. It was discovered and photographed by the Third German Antarctic Expedition, 1938–39. It was mapped from air photos and surveys by the Sixth Norwegian Antarctic Expedition, 1956–60, and named Eidsgavlen (the isthmus gable).

References 

Cliffs of Queen Maud Land
Humboldt Mountains (Antarctica)